Greater Malang is a region in East Java, Indonesia, encompassing the municipality of Malang and its hinterland. Over 3 million people in East Java came from Greater Malang. The principal city, Malang is well-known as the home of notable universities in Indonesia, and its suburb, Batu, is well-known as a tourism centre in East Java.

History

Karesidenan Malang
In the Dutch colonial era, Greater Malang was a residency, an old form of second-tier subdivision, called Karesidenan Malang (Malang Residency), consisting of four cities (Malang, Batu, Pasuruan, Probolinggo) and four regencies (Malang Regency, Pasuruan Regency, Probolinggo Regency, Lumajang Regency). But now, the definition of Greater Malang just consists of the Malang highlands area, namely Malang city, Batu city, and Malang Regency. Even this is excessive, as parts of Malang Regency - the 9 districts in the south (bordering the south coast of East Java) and the 3 districts lying west of Batu city - are not part of the Malang Valley urbanisation.

Demography 

Sources:

 Statistics Indonesia

Geography
Greater Malang is located in the middle of East Java, and the eastern part of the region includes the Eastern salient of Java region. The region covers over 3,000 km2.

The eastern section of Greater Malang, among Java's most rugged regions, isolates the eastern salient from Java's central heartland to its west. The Tengger massif (including Mount Bromo), and Mount Semeru, Java's highest peak, lie in this section. The western area of this region is also a mountainous region, including Arjuno-Welirang and Kawi-Butak. However, those parts of the Regency to the south of Greater Malang are just a lower elevation plain, with the southern coast bordering the Indian Ocean and small karst hills below 1000 metres.

Climate
While most parts of the region are plateau or highlands (except the southern area), the climate of Greater Malang is milder than the rest of Indonesia. In middle of year, mountainous area of Greater Malang over 2000 metres above sea level, is dry winter with light snow and frost, which means the temperature always below zero Celsius during late night until morning, especially the light snow is commonly visible in Bromo Tengger Semeru National Park.

According to the Köppen-Geiger climate classification, the climate of Malang city is tropical monsoon (Am).

According to the Köppen-Geiger climate classification, the climate of Batu city and Upper Greater Malang over 1000 metres above sea level classified as subtropical highland variety(Cwb).

Panoramas

See also 

 Gerbangkertosusila
 List of metropolitan areas in Indonesia

References

External links 

 Official website of Malang city 
 Official website of Batu city
 Official website of Malang Regency

Batu, East Java
Malang
Populated places in East Java